Route 17, also known as Chief Peguis Trail, or CPT, is a major highway in Winnipeg, Manitoba, Canada. The highway connects Routes 52 (Main Street) and 20 (Lagimodiere Boulevard).

Route description 
Route 17 is the lowest numbered Winnipeg city route. The first section of roadway (between Main and Henderson) was opened on October 19, 1990, and officially named the Chief Peguis Trail on November 1, 1991. The second section was opened on December 2, 2011. The first extension routes most vehicular traffic away from collector and residential streets throughout the North Kildonan ward travelling west-east.

The extension includes features such as:
 Grade-separated overpass at Rothesay Street
 Pedestrian bridge just west of Gateway Road—allowing the Northeast Pioneers Greenway to pass overtop of the CPT, circumventing the at-grade crosswalk
 Built-in Active Transportation trail along the northern projection

Chief Peguis Trail crosses the Red River. The bridge over the river is called the Kildonan Settlers Bridge, and features names of local early settlers of the area on each street light.

Chief Peguis Trail is part of a proposed strategic inner ring road, alternative to the Perimeter Highway.

Future 
The City of Winnipeg is studying a  western extension connecting with Routes 180 (McPhillips Street) and 90 (Brookside Boulevard).

anticipates  the route being further extended—west  and east Plessis Road and potentially the East Perimeter.

Major intersections

See also

 List of Manitoba Expressways

References

External links

Official Website

017
Winnipeg 017